Watford Junction Motive Power Depot was a traction maintenance depot located in Watford, Hertfordshire, England. The depot was situated on the Watford DC line and was near Watford Junction station.

The depot code was WJ.

History 
From 1960 to 1965, when the depot closed, Class 08 shunters, Class 11 and  24 locomotives could be seen at the depot.

References 

 Railway depots in England